Laranjeiras station is part of the Blue Line of the Lisbon Metro and is located in the Palma de Baixo neighbourhood.

History
Laranjeiras station opened on 14 October 1988 in conjunction with the Colégio Militar and Alto dos Moinhos stations. It is located on Estrada das Laranjeiras, after which it is named. 

The architectural design of the station is by António J. Mendes.

Connections

Urban buses

Carris 
 701 Campo Grande (Metro) ⇄ Campo de Ourique (Prazeres)
 726 Sapadores ⇄ Pontinha Centro
 764 Cidade Universitária ⇄ Damaia de Cima

See also
 List of Lisbon metro stations

References

External links

Blue Line (Lisbon Metro) stations
Railway stations opened in 1988